Doctor Doctor (outside of Australasia known as The Heart Guy) is an Australian drama series. It premiered on Nine Network on 14 September 2016. The series follows Hugh Knight (Rodger Corser), a  heart surgeon, who is punished for a number of mishaps and is put on probation and forced to work in the country town of Whyhope for a year as a G.P., which coincidentally happens to be his hometown.

Series overview

Episodes

Season 1 (2016)

Season 2 (2017)

Season 3 (2018)

Season 4 (2020)

Season 5 (2021)

Ratings

References

Lists of Australian drama television series episodes